Actinostrobus is a genus of coniferous trees in the Cupressaceae (cypress family). Common names include cypress, sandplain-cypress and cypress-pine, the last of these shared by the closely related genus Callitris.

Species
There are three species in the genus, all endemic to southwestern Western Australia:

A 2010 study of Actinostrobus and Callitris has placed all three species of Actinostrobus within an expanded Callitris based on analysis of 42 morphological and anatomical characters.

The leaves are arranged in six rows along the twigs, in alternating whorls of three.

The cones remain closed on the trees for many years, opening only after being scorched by a bushfire; this then releases the seeds to grow on the newly cleared burnt ground.

The closest relative of Actinostrobus is Callitris, which is much more widespread, occurring in most of Australia, and differs in its cones lacking the basal whorls of small sterile scales.

The wood of Actinostrobus is light, soft and aromatic, but the plants are too small for any significant use. They are occasionally planted as ornamental shrubs, but their use is restricted by the high risks imposed by their very high flammability in bushfires.

References

 
Farjon, A. (2005). Monograph of Cupressaceae and Sciadopitys. Royal Botanic Gardens, Kew. .
Gymnosperm Database - Actinostrobus
Arboretum de Villardebelle - Photos of cones

 
Flora of Western Australia
Pinales of Australia
Conifer genera